Chadwick is a northern suburb of Esperance, a town in south-eastern Western Australia. Its local government area is the Shire of Esperance.

Chadwick was gazetted in 1971, and at the 2006 census, Chadwick had a population of 165.

References

Suburbs of Esperance, Western Australia